Amal Sportive d'Essaouira, also known as Amal Essaouira or ASE, is a Moroccan basketball club. The club plays in the Nationale 1, the top tier competition in Morocco. In 2014, ASE participated in the Arab Club Competition.

Players

Notable players

 Jeremy Kendle
 Stéphane Konaté (2008–2010)

Head coaches
 Milan Škobalj (2013–2014)

References

Basketball teams established in 1920
Basketball teams in Morocco